The Adventures of Down Under Dan is a point-and-click adventure game for MS-DOS created by Australian developer PowerVision and published in 1995 by Guildsoft Games in Britain and Australia. The game is a comical adventure game starring a parody of an Australian Crocodile Hunter much in the style of Crocodile Dundee. A boxed demonstration version of this game was also released on CD-ROM, entitled "A Day in The Life of Down Under Dan".

Plot
Dan takes a plane over the Australian Outback in search of opal. The plane crashes and causes him to lose his memory. He stumbles through the wilderness avoiding dangers, coming across a farm house and a small town. Through a series of odd jobs and scenarios, Dan finds himself on a rushing river, leading him to a gold covered beach where he claims his riches.

External links

GuildSoft Sales thanks to Archive.org

1995 video games
DOS games
DOS-only games
Point-and-click adventure games
Video games developed in Australia
Video games set in Australia